Fleurette may refer to:
 a small flower, in the French language
 Fleurette (opera), an opera by American composer and conductor Emma Roberto Steiner (1856–1929)
 an 1864 opera by Alsatian composer Viktor Nessler (1841–1890)
 Fleurette Beauchamp-Huppé (1907–2007), Canadian pianist, teacher and soprano
 Fleurette Campeau (born 1941), a Canadian fencer
 a type of Crème fraiche

Feminine given names